Jahren is the German plural for the word year and a surname.

People with the surname
 Anne Jahren (born 1963), Norwegian former cross-country skier 
 Gunder Anton Johannesen Jahren (1858–1933), Norwegian politician for the Conservative Party
 Hope Jahren (born 1969), American geochemist and geobiologist
 Paul Jahren (1895–1963), Norwegian sport wrestler
 Silje Ekroll Jahren (born 1988), Norwegian orienteering competitor

See also 
 Jahr (disambiguation)
 Jaren (given name)